Brody Sutter (born September 26, 1991) is a Canadian professional ice hockey forward who is currently an unrestricted free agent. He most recently played for the Vienna Capitals in the ICE Hockey League (ICEHL). He was drafted by the Carolina Hurricanes, 193rd overall in the 2011 NHL Entry Draft.

Playing career
As a youth, Sutter played in the 2004 Quebec International Pee-Wee Hockey Tournament with the Florida Junior Panthers minor ice hockey team. He later played with the Lethbridge Hurricanes of the Western Hockey League, from 2008 to 2012. Before signing a three-year entry level contract with the Carolina Hurricanes on June 1, 2012.

In the early stages of the 2014–15 season, Sutter was recalled from the Checkers to the Hurricanes. He made his NHL debut with the Hurricanes in a 2–1 shootout defeat to the New York Rangers at Madison Square Garden on October 16, 2014.

Approaching the beginning of the 2016–17 season, Sutter was traded by the Hurricanes to the Florida Panthers in exchange for Connor Brickley on October 11, 2016.  He was directly assigned to inaugural AHL affiliate, the Springfield Thunderbirds, to play out his contract. Sutter was limited through injury to just 18 games with the Thunderbirds, contributing 9 points.

As a free agent from the Panthers, Sutter agreed to a one-year AHL contract with the Manitoba Moose on July 5, 2017. In the 2017–18 season, Sutter made 58 appearances with the Moose contributing with 8 goals and 18 points.

Sutter left North America after six professional seasons, agreeing to a one-year deal with Finnish club, Vaasan Sport of the Liiga on August 2, 2018. In the 2018–19 season, Sutter added a physical presence and forward depth to Sport, posting 9 goals and 21 points through 45 games, while failing to qualify for the post-season.

As a free agent, Sutter continued his career in Europe, agreeing to a one-year contract with German club, Iserlohn Roosters of the DEL on May 8, 2019. He played with the Roosters for two season before signing with the Vienna Capitals for the 2021-2022 season.

Personal life
Sutter is a member of the Sutter family, the son of Duane Sutter. Brody overlapped with his cousins in the Carolina organization; Brett from late in the 2011-12 season until Brody's departure during the 2013-2014 season,  the two played together with Carolina's AHL affiliate the Charlotte Checkers. Brody, Brett and cousin Brandon were briefly in the organization together during the 2011-2012 season but Brandon was traded in the offseason to Pittsburgh.

Career statistics

References

External links

1991 births
Living people
Ice hockey people from Alberta
Canadian ice hockey centres
Carolina Hurricanes draft picks
Carolina Hurricanes players
Charlotte Checkers (2010–) players
Florida Everblades players
Iserlohn Roosters players
Lethbridge Hurricanes players
Manitoba Moose players
People from Beaver County, Alberta
Saskatoon Blades players
Springfield Thunderbirds players
Brody
Vaasan Sport players
Vienna Capitals players